Dyschirius bousqueti is a species of ground beetle in the subfamily Scaritinae. It was described by Bulirsch in 2006.

References

bousqueti
Beetles described in 2006